Two Islands and Two Islands Reef are part of the Three Islands Group National Park in Far North Queensland, Australia, in the Coral Sea,  northwest of Brisbane, about  north-northeast of Cooktown,  southeast of Cape Flattery, and  north of Three Islands and Three Islands Reef.

The islands are located within the Great Barrier Reef Marine Park Authority, and are important and protected seabird nesting sites.

See also

 Protected areas of Queensland

References
Map, nprsr.qld.gov.au 
About Three Islands Group, nprsr.qld.gov.au

Islands on the Great Barrier Reef
National parks of Far North Queensland
Protected areas established in 1939
1939 establishments in Australia
Islands of Far North Queensland